Dmitriyevka is a rural locality (a selo) and the administrative center of Dmitriyevsky Selsoviet of Mazanovsky District, Amur Oblast, Russia. The population was 168 as of 2018. There are 7 streets.

Geography 
Dmitriyevka is located on the left bank of the Birma River, 46 km south of Novokiyevsky Uval (the district's administrative centre) by road. Kanichi is the nearest rural locality.

References 

Rural localities in Mazanovsky District